Kannai Nambathey is a 2023 Indian Tamil-language crime thriller film written and directed by Mu. Maran. The film stars Udhayanidhi Stalin and Aathmika. Siddhu Kumar scores music for the film and editing is handled by San Lokesh. The film was released theatrically on 17 March 2023.

Cast 
Source: The Times of India (except where noted)

Production 
The film announcement made in around early 2019 about the making of the film casting Udhayanidhi Stalin titled Kannai Nambathey by director Mu. Maran. The title of the film was taken from a song from the 1975 film Ninaithadhai Mudippavan. Maran announced that the film is set in the crime thriller genre, similar to his directorial debut Iravukku Aayiram Kangal. He wanted an actress with a girl next door image to be the lead actress on decided on Aathmika, whose performance in Meesaya Murukku impressed him. Principal photography commenced on 11 February 2019. The film experienced production delays, with actress Subiksha Krishnan's portions only being completed by January 2022.

Release and reception 
The film was released theatrically on 17 March 2023, delayed from February.

Maalai Malar gave 3.25 rating out of 5 and stated that although there are some questions about the script, it does not seem like a big deal; the director has given the film so much that it is impossible to guess what the next scenes will be. Logesh Balachandran critic from The Times of India wrote that "with better lighting techniques and staging, and tighter writing in the second half, the film might have created a greater impact on us" and gave 2.5 stars out of 5. Dinamalar critic gave a 2.75 rating out of 5.  

Dinamani wrote that the cinematics of the climax scene are not enjoyable. Virakesari critic gave 3.5 out if 5 rating and stated that Srikanth as usual has lived up to the director's expectations. Murugadoss C critic from News18 stated that this film belongs to decent thriller category.

References

External links 
 

2023 films
Indian crime thriller films
2020s Tamil-language films